Joralemon or Joroleman is a surname. Joralemon Street in Brooklyn, New York was named in 1805 for Tumis Joralemon, the first person to own a brick house in Brooklyn. The classic American mailbox is the Jorolemon mailbox, designed in 1915 by a postal employee named Roy J. Joroleman.

Notable people with the surname include:

Dorothy Rieber Joralemon (1893-1987), American sculptor, artist and writer
Edgar Eugene Joralemon (1858-1937), American architect
Ira Joralemon (1884-1975), American mining engineer and popular science writer
Peter David Joralemon, writer on Olmec religion
Roy J. Joroleman, designer of the Jorolemon mailbox used in the United States

See also
Joralemon Street in Brooklyn, named for Tumis Joralemon
Joralemon Street Tunnel, part of the New York Subway
58 Joralemon Street, an 1847 house and since 1907 a subway vent

References